Richard Lawrence Hoffman (September 25, 1927 – June 10, 2012) was an American zoologist known as an international expert on millipedes, and a leading authority on the natural history of Virginia and the Appalachian Mountains. He was a biology professor at Virginia's Radford College for almost thirty years, and curator of invertebrates at the Virginia Museum of Natural History for another twenty years. He co-founded the Virginia Natural History Society, described over 400 species of millipedes, and produced more than 480 scientific publications. He is commemorated in the scientific and/or common names of over 30 animal species, including the valley and ridge salamander (Plethodon hoffmani) and Hoffman's dwarf centipede (Nannarrup hoffmani).

Biography

Richard Hoffman was born in Clifton Forge, Virginia, on September 25, 1927. His father was a railroad machinist whose parents had emigrated from Germany in the late 1800s, and his mother was from a Virginia farming family. Hoffman's scientific publications began at the age of 16, and by the age of 24 he had 29 publications. He attended the University of Virginia until 1950, where he was influenced by Horton H. Hobbs, Jr. a crustacean biologist and recently hired professor. Unable to complete a freshman math class, Hoffman did not complete a degree at Virginia. Rather, in 1951 he was accepted into graduate school at Cornell University, who accepted his publication record as equivalent to passing a math class. When not working in the field or at Cornell, Hoffman worked as a chemist at the Radford Arsenal. He completed his a M.S. in entomology in 1959, and went on to earn a PhD in Zoology from Virginia Tech in 1960, during which he revised the genus Cambarincola, a group of leech-like oligochaete worms that are commensal on crayfish. His doctoral advisor at Virginia Tech was Dr. Perry C. Holt.

After completing his PhD, Hoffman worked as professor of biology at Radford College (now known as Radford University) from 1960 to 1988. Over this 28-year period, Hoffman taught a number of courses including introductory biology and zoology, invertebrate zoology, entomology, herpetology, mammalogy, biogeography, and the history of science. From 1964 to 1970 Hoffman edited The Radford Review, the college's scholarly journal. Hoffman made dramatic improvements to the collections of the Radford Natural History Museum. From 1989 to 2009, Hoffman worked as Curator of Recent Invertebrates at the Virginia Museum of Natural History.

Hoffman died on June 10, 2012 at Carilion Roanoke Memorial Hospital in Roanoke, Virginia following heart surgery. He was 84. His contributions to science and education were formally recognized by the Virginia General Assembly in 2013.

Research

Hoffman was recognized as the world's leading authority of millipedes of his time. He authored or co-authored at least 380 scientific papers on millipedes, and described over 400 species and subspecies, as well as over 200 genera. In 1958, Hoffman co-authored with Ralph V. Chamberlin a checklist of millipedes of North America, the first such work since 1893, which represented an approximate 600% increase in species recorded. Four decades later, Hoffman's 1999 "Checklist of the millipeds of North and Middle America" built upon on his previous work with Chamberlin, as well as checklists of the Caribbean and Central America by Chamberlin and Loomis respectively, to include over 2,100 species. Hoffman founded and edited the journal Myriapodologica from 1978 to 2007. He is commemorated in the names of two families, six genera, 19 species, and two subspecies of millipedes, as well as two species of centipede. He coined new names for anatomical structures, including the terms "ozadene and "ozopore" for the defensive glands and accompanying openings of millipedes, and the term "ocellarium" for the patches of ocelli on each side of the head, also known as ocular fields or "eyes".   He also published on fossil millipedes, describing extinct groups and producing a "classic summary" of the millipede fossil record for the Treatise on Invertebrate Paleontology. In 2007, a festschrift consisting of papers from 41 authors on four continents was assembled in honor of Hoffman's 80th birthday.

Hoffman also wrote over 70 papers on the natural history and conservation of reptiles and amphibians. The valley and ridge salamander (Plethodon hoffmani) is named in his honor. Hoffman also studied insects, mollusks, crustaceans, arachnids, and other invertebrates, and co-founded The Insects of Virginia, a series of occasional publications which ran from 1969 to 2006. Nine insects, three crustaceans, a nematode, an annelid, and a genus of mites have been named after him.

Influences
Roble and Mitchell write that Hoffman's meeting with Hobbs as an undergraduate was the "most significant event in shaping Richard's future career", from whom he learned how to be a good scientist, and whom Hoffman later considered his only true mentor. Hoffman also expressed admiration for the late Dutch biologist C. A. W. Jeekel, whose early correspondence and subsequent friendship affected Hoffman's approach to taxonomy. Hoffman wrote that Jeekel's 1971 Nomenclator Generum et Familiarum Diplopodorum "set the standard for milliped systematics in the era that is now ending" and that Jeekel was somewhat a role model, and "the only person who I conceded to be my master in our field of interest".  Despite working with Chamberlin early in his career, Hoffman later described the period as "under the malign influence of R.V. Chamberlin, an exemplar of minimal taxonomy", while Hoffman favored rich descriptions synthesizing previous relevant literature rather than scant, isolated descriptions.

Major works

Eponymous taxa
The following is a selection of taxa named after Hoffman.
Hoffmaneumatidae Golovatch, 1978 (a family of millipedes in the order Chordeumatida)
Hoffmaneuma Golovatch, 1978 (a millipede genus in the family Hoffmaneumatidae)
Hoffmanobolidae Shelley, 2001 (a monotypic family of millipedes the order Spirobolida)
Hoffmanides Kraus, 1966 (a millipede genus in the family Odontopygidae)
Hoffmanina Jeekel, 1968 (a millipede genus in the family Paradoxosomatidae)
Hoffmanodesmus Schubart, 1962 (a millipede genus in the family Chelodesmidae)
Andrognathus hoffmani Shear & Marek 2009 (a millipede in the family Andrognathidae)
Nannarrup hoffmani Foddai, Bonato, Pereira & Minelli, 2003 (a soil centipede discovered in New York City's Central Park)
Plethodon hoffmani Highton, 1972 (a salamander in the family Plethodontidae)
Eucarlia hoffmani Golovatch & Korsós, 1992
Chaleponcus vilici Enghoff, 2014

See also
Ecology of the Appalachian Mountains
Peaks of Otter salamander, which Hoffman had a role in discovering
Environment of Virginia

References

External links
Myriapodological works by Richard L. Hoffman, compiled by the Centre International de Myriapodologie

Myriapodologica collected papers

1927 births
2012 deaths
American entomologists
American herpetologists
American people of German descent
Cornell University College of Agriculture and Life Sciences alumni
University of Virginia alumni
Virginia Tech alumni
Radford University faculty
People from Clifton Forge, Virginia
People from Martinsville, Virginia
Myriapodologists
Scientists from Virginia